Nosotros los guapos is a Mexican sitcom that premiered on Blim on August 19, 2016, and ended on Las Estrellas on 16 February 2020. The series is created and produced by Guillermo del Bosque for Televisa. The series stars Adrián Uribe and Ariel Miramontes.

Plot 
Vítor and Albertano are in pursuit of the same objective: to find a place to live, and as much as they don't want to, get a job that allows them to live and pay the rent for the room that the two decide to share at Doña Cuca's house. Although at first Vítor and Albertano do not like each other, they still decide to get together to get jobs in whatever they can. From day one, Vítor and Albertano will have to "endure" their differences in tastes and different ways of seeing life.

In season four, Vítor and Albertano win the lottery and become millionaires overnight. They will remain the same, although now facing new situations and making their biggest dreams come true, from living as millionaire playboys in Acapulco to giving their neighborhood the biggest party they have ever had. In addition Natacha, a former police officer, comes to their lives to become their bodyguard, friend and companion of adventures.

Cast

Main 
 Adrián Uribe as El Vítor
 Ariel Miramontes as Albertano
 Carmen Salinas as Refugio Encarnación Flores “Doña Cuca”
 Malillany Marín as Rosita (season 1)
 Wendy Braga as Lupita (seasons 2–3, guest season 4)
 Manuel "Flaco" Ibáñez as Don Nacho (season 2–4)
 Vanessa Bauche as Natacha (season 4)

Episodes

Series overview

Season 1 (2016)

Season 2 (2017)

Season 3 (2017)

Season 4 (2019) 

Notes

Awards and nominations

References

External links 
 

Mexican television sitcoms
2016 Mexican television series debuts
2020 Mexican television series endings
Television series by Televisa
Blim TV original programming
Las Estrellas original programming
Spanish-language television shows
2010s Mexican comedy television series
2020s Mexican comedy television series